Christian Daniel Bravo Araneda (born 1 October 1993), nicknamed Plancha (Plate/Printed image), is a Chilean professional footballer who plays as a winger for Barnechea.

Club career
Born in Iquique, Bravo graduated from Universidad de Chile, and made his debut on 15 May 2010 in a match against Lota Schwager, for the year's Copa Chile. He made his league debut on 27 November of the following year, starting in a 1–1 away draw against Audax Italiano.

Bravo only appeared sparingly for La U in the following years, and in January 2013 moved to NK Inter Zaprešić as a free agent. On 26 July 2013 he joined Granada CF, being assigned to the reserves in Segunda División B.

Bravo made his debut with the Andalusians' main squad on 12 April 2014, replacing Yacine Brahimi in a 1–0 La Liga home win against FC Barcelona.

International career
He made his Chile national football team debut on 10 September 2019 in a friendly against Honduras. He substituted César Pinares in the 80th minute.

Personal life
He is son of Chilean former international footballer Christian Bravo Franke.

Honours
Universidad de Chile
 Primera División (3): 2011 Apertura, 2011 Clausura, 2012 Apertura
 Copa Sudamericana (1): 2011

Universidad Católica
 Primera División (2): 2016 Clausura, 2016 Apertura
 Supercopa de Chile (1): 2016

References

External links
 
 
 

1993 births
Living people
People from Iquique
Chilean footballers
Association football wingers
Universidad de Chile footballers
NK Inter Zaprešić players
Club Recreativo Granada players
Granada CF footballers
Club Deportivo Universidad Católica footballers
Unión Española footballers
San Luis de Quillota footballers
Montevideo Wanderers F.C. players
Peñarol players
Everton de Viña del Mar footballers
A.C. Barnechea footballers
Chilean Primera División players
Segunda División B players
La Liga players
Uruguayan Primera División players
Chile under-20 international footballers
Chile international footballers
Chilean expatriate footballers
Chilean expatriate sportspeople in Croatia
Chilean expatriate sportspeople in Spain
Chilean expatriate sportspeople in Uruguay
Expatriate footballers in Croatia
Expatriate footballers in Spain
Expatriate footballers in Uruguay